Lancel may refer to:

People
Andrew Lancel (born 1970), English actor
Edmond Lancel (1888–1959), Belgian chess master
Serge Lancel (1928–2005), French archaeologist
Lancel Victor de Hamel (1849–1894), Australian politician

Other uses
Lancel (company), a French leather goods company
Lancel Lannister, a fictitious character in A Song of Ice and Fire and Game of Thrones